The  is an AC electric multiple unit (EMU) operated by Hokkaido Railway Company (JR Hokkaido) on Sapporo area suburban services in Hokkaido, Japan since 1988.

Design
The trains were built jointly by Hitachi, JR Hokkaido (Naebo Factory), Kawasaki Heavy Industries, and Tokyu Car (Yokohama).

Fleet
As of 1 April 2012, the fleet consists of 135 vehicles, formed as 23 3-car sets and 11 6-car sets.

Variants
 721-0 series
 721-1000 series
 721-2000 series
 721-3000 series
 721-4000 series
 721-5000 series

References

Electric multiple units of Japan
Hokkaido Railway Company
Train-related introductions in 1988
Hitachi multiple units
Kawasaki multiple units
Tokyu Car multiple units
20 kV AC multiple units